What We Do Is Secret is a 12" EP compiling material recorded by the Germs. It was released posthumously by Slash Records in the United States in 1981 as SREP-108. It was later also released in 1982 in Italy on the Expanded Music label as EX-20-Y. What We Do Is Secret includes the three songs from the band's second release, the Lexicon Devil EP, as well as one cover, one outtake, some crowd conversation from the band's last show, and two live tracks.

The title was taken from the first track of their 1979 (GI) LP, which was not included on this release.

A 2008 biopic of vocalist Darby Crash and the Germs was also titled What We Do Is Secret.

Track listing

References

1982 EPs
Germs (band) EPs
Slash Records EPs
1982 compilation albums
Germs (band) compilation albums
Slash Records compilation albums
EPs published posthumously